Fouke (or Fulke) Salisbury was Dean of St Asaph from 1493 until 1543.

Salisbury was born at Lleweni. In 1501 he was Rector of Glympton.

References 

People from Denbighshire
15th-century Welsh Roman Catholic priests
16th-century Welsh Anglican priests
Deans of St Asaph
1543 deaths